Felicity Wren is a British actress.

Biography

Felicity co-founded the Unrestricted View Theatre company in 1997. Unrestricted View became the resident company at the Hen and Chickens Theatre in Islington, London in 1999.
 Felicity was joint awarded Best Venue Manager by the Fringe Report in 2005.

Felicity performed as Mary in Glyn Maxwell's The Lifeblood of 2001.

Filmography
 Love Talk (2008)
 I of the Lost (2010)

References

External links
 Felicity Wren at MySpace

British actresses
Living people
Place of birth missing (living people)
Year of birth missing (living people)